Tomlinson House is a historic home located at Keeseville in Essex County, New York.  It was built in 1846 and is a two-story frame late-Federal style residence.  It features a portico with four slender Doric order style columns supporting a plain frieze and pediment.

It was listed on the National Register of Historic Places in 1983.

References

Houses on the National Register of Historic Places in New York (state)
Federal architecture in New York (state)
Houses completed in 1846
Houses in Essex County, New York
National Register of Historic Places in Essex County, New York